Elvina Vidot (born 25 November 1993) is a blind French Paralympic athlete who competes in sprinting and long jump events in international level events.

References

1993 births
Living people
Athletes from Paris
Sportspeople from Réunion
Paralympic athletes of France
French female sprinters
French female long jumpers
Medalists at the World Para Athletics European Championships